This timeline documents all of the events of the 2014 Pacific typhoon season. Most of the tropical cyclones forming between May and November. The scope of this article is limited to the Pacific Ocean, north of the equator between 100°E and the International Date Line. Tropical storms that form in the entire Western Pacific basin are assigned a name by the Japan Meteorological Agency. Tropical depressions that form in this basin are given a number with a "W" suffix by the United States' Joint Typhoon Warning Center. In addition, the Philippine Atmospheric, Geophysical and Astronomical Services Administration (PAGASA) assigns names to tropical cyclones (including tropical depressions) that enter or form in the Philippine area of responsibility. These names, however, are not in common use outside of the Philippines.

During the season, 30 systems were designated as Tropical Depressions by either, the Japan Meteorological Agency (JMA), the Philippine Atmospheric, Geophysical and Astronomical Services Administration (PAGASA), the Joint Typhoon Warning Center (JTWC), or other National Meteorological and Hydrological Services such as the China Meteorological Administration and the Hong Kong Observatory. As they run the Regional Specialized Meteorological Centre for the Western Pacific, the JMA assigns names to Tropical Depressions should they intensify into a tropical storm. PAGASA also assign local names to tropical depressions which form within their area of responsibility; however, these names are not in common use outside of PAGASA's area of responsibility. In this season, 19 systems entered or formed in the Philippine area of responsibility, which eight of them directly made landfall over the Philippines.

The first half of the season was relatively active with seven named storms. During the season, six typhoons underwent rapid deepening. The deadliest and damaging storm so far is Rammasun, killing nearly 200 people with damages of about $7 billion. During August, Hurricane Genevieve entered the basin as a super typhoon. During mid-August, as Genevieve began to weaken, tropical activity in the Northwest Pacific began to decrease, making it the first time no tropical storms develop during the peak of the season since records began. This also occurred for the second time during mid-October, after the dissipation of Vongfong. In early October, Vongfong reached its peak intensity as a strong Category 5 typhoon, the strongest since Typhoon Haiyan in November 2013.

Timeline of events

The season has a relatively below-normal quantity of named storms, although a large number of those (eight) became super typhoons, including seven Category 5 storms. The season is not as active and costly as the previous season. During the first half of the season, it was active with seven storms forming due to a developing weak El Niño, however this failed during August. The most active month so far in the season is July; with four storms developing and made landfall, with three of them reaching super typhoon strength. With this, the season became quiet as of August 15, following the dissipation of Genevieve, although only few depressions formed but never strengthened into tropical storms. This continued until the first week of September, as the tropics within the basin started to get active again, with three tropical depressions in the same time. Tropical activity began to rise again during mid-September, although the season became quiet again after the dissipation of Vongfong, with a pause of Nuri's lifecycle.

January
January 15

January 18

00:00 UTC – The JMA reports that the tropical depression previously located east of Surigao City has intensified into a tropical storm and names it "Lingling".
00:00 UTC – The Joint Typhoon Warning Center (JTWC) designates Tropical Storm Lingling as Tropical Depression 01W.

January 19

January 20

00:00 UTC – The JMA reports that Tropical Storm Lingling (01W) has weakened into a tropical depression.

January 29

January 30
18:00 UTC – The JTWC designates the tropical depression previously located southwest of Guam as Tropical Depression 02W.

January 31

00:00 UTC – The JMA reports that Tropical Depression 02W has intensified into a tropical storm and names it "Kajiki".
06:00 UTC – The JTWC reports that Tropical Depression Kajiki (02W) has intensified into a tropical storm.
18:00 UTC – The JTWC reports that Tropical Storm Kajiki (02W) has weakened into a tropical depression.

February

February 1

06:00 UTC – The JMA reports that Tropical Storm Kajiki (02W) has weakened into a tropical depression.

February 27

February 28

00:00 UTC – The JTWC designates the tropical depression previously located southeast of Guam as Tropical Depression 03W.
12:00 UTC – The JMA reports that Tropical Depression 03W has intensified into a tropical storm, and names it "Faxai".
18:00 UTC – The JTWC reports that Tropical Depression Faxai (03W) has intensified into a tropical storm.

March
March 3

06:00 UTC – The JMA reports that Tropical Storm Faxai (03W) has intensified into a severe tropical storm.

March 4

12:00 UTC – The JMA reports that Severe Tropical Storm Faxai (03W) has intensified into a typhoon.
12:00 UTC – The JTWC reports that Tropical Storm Faxai (03W) has intensified into a category 1 typhoon.

March 5

00:00 UTC – The JMA reports that Typhoon Faxai (03W) has weakened into a severe tropical storm.
06:00 UTC – The JTWC reports that Typhoon Faxai (03W) has weakened into a tropical storm.
12:00 UTC – The JMA reports that Severe Tropical Storm Faxai (03W) has weakened into a tropical storm.

March 6

March 8

March 18

March 20
18:00 UTC — PAGASA initiates warnings on the tropical depression and names it Caloy.

March 21
20:00 UTC — Tropical Depression Caloy makes landfall on the Philippine island of Mindanao, in the vicinity of Tandag Surigao Del Sur.

March 22
00:00 UTC — The JTWC initiates warnings on the tropical depression and assigns it the designation 04W.
18:00 UTC — The JTWC issues its final advisory on Tropical Depression Caloy.

April
April 2

April 3
00:00 UTC — The JTWC initiates advisories on the tropical depression and assigns it the designation 05W.

April 4
18:00 UTC — The JTWC reports that Tropical Depression 05W has intensified into a tropical storm.

April 5
00:00 UTC — The JMA reports that Tropical Depression 05W has intensified into a tropical storm and names it Peipah. They also estimate that the system has peaked with 10-minute sustained wind speeds of 65 km/h (45 mph).
12:00 UTC — The JMA reports that Tropical Storm Peipah has weakened into a tropical depression.

April 6
06:00 UTC — PAGASA reports that Tropical Depression Peipah has entered its area of responsibility and names it Domeng.
12:00 UTC — The JTWC reports that Tropical Storm Peipah (Domeng) has weakened into a tropical depression.

April 8
06:00 UTC — The JMA reports that Tropical Depression Peipah (Domeng) has dissipated to the southeast of Manila on the Philippine island of Luzon.

April 10
06:00 UTC — The JTWC issues its final advisory on Tropical Depression Peipah (Domeng), as the system has weakened into a tropical disturbance.

April 13

April 15

April 19

April 21

April 27
12:00 UTC — The JTWC initiates advisories on the tropical depression and assigns it the designation 06W.

April 28
00:00 UTC — Both the JTWC and the JMA report that the tropical depression has intensified into a tropical storm, with the JMA naming the system Tapah.

April 29
00:00 UTC — The JTWC reports that Tropical Storm Tapah has intensified into a typhoon.
06:00 UTC — The JTWC reports that Typhoon Tapah has peaked with 1-minute sustained wind speeds of  while equivalent to a Category 1 typhoon on the SSHWS.
18:00 UTC — The JTWC reports that Typhoon Tapah has weakened into a tropical storm.

April 30
06:00 UTC — The JMA reports that Severe Tropical Storm Tapah has weakened into a tropical storm.

May
May 1
00:00 UTC — The JMA reports that Tropical Storm Tapah has weakened into a tropical depression.
09:00 UTC — The JTWC reports that Tropical Storm Tapah has weakened into a tropical depression and issues its final advisory on the system.

May 2

June

June 9

June 10
03:00 UTC — PAGASA initiates advisories on the tropical depression, previously located to the south-southwest of Taipei, Taiwan and names it Ester.

June 11
00:00 UTC — The JMA reports that Tropical Depression Ester has intensified into a tropical storm.
06:00 UTC — The JMA names Tropical Storm Ester: Mitag as they estimate that the system has peaked with 10-minute sustained wind speeds of 75 km/h (45 mph).

June 12
00:00 UTC — The JMA reports that Tropical Storm Mitag (Ester) has weakened into a tropical depression.
06:00 UTC — The JMA reports that Tropical Depression Mitag (Ester) has dissipated.

June 14
00:00 UTC — The JMA reports that the tropical depression previously located to the south-southwest of Taipei, Taiwan has developed into a tropical storm.
06:00 UTC — The JMA names the tropical storm: Hagibis.
06:00 UTC — The JTWC initiates advisories on Tropical Storm Hagibis and assigns it the designation 07W.

June 15
08:50 UTC — Tropical Storm Hagibis made landfall at Shantou in the Chinese province of Guangdong.
12:00 UTC — The JTWC issues its final advisory on Tropical Storm Hagibis, after the system had made landfall on China.
18:00 UTC — The JMA reports that Tropical Storm Hagibis has weakened into a tropical depression over Guangdong.

June 16
18:00 UTC — The JTWC re-initiates advisories on Tropical Depression Hagibis, after the system has moved into the East China Sea.

June 17
00:00 UTC — The JMA reports that Tropical Depression Hagibis has re-intensified into a tropical storm and estimates that it has reached its peak intensity with 10-minute sustained wind speeds of 75 km/h (45 mph).
12:00 UTC — The JMA reports that Tropical Storm Hagibis has weakened into a tropical depression, as the system passes near or over the Japanese region of Kyūshū.
18:00 UTC — The JMA reports that Tropical Depression Hagibis, has transitioned into an extratropical cyclone.

June 23
00:00 UTC — The JMA stops monitoring the extratropical remnants of Tropical Storm Hagibis, as they move into the Eastern Pacific.

July
July 2

July 3
00:00 UTC — The JTWC initiates advisories on the tropical depression and assigns it the designation 08W.
18:00 UTC — The JMA and JTWC report that Tropical Depression 08W has intensified into a tropical storm.

July 4
00:00 UTC — The JMA names the tropical storm: Neoguri.
12:00 UTC — The JMA reports that Tropical Storm Neoguri, has intensified into a typhoon.
18:00 UTC — The JTWC reports that Tropical Storm Neoguri has intensified and become equivalent to a Category 1 typhoon on the SSHWS.

July 5
00:00 UTC — The JTWC reports that Typhoon Neoguri has become equivalent to a Category 2 typhoon on the SSHWS.
06:00 UTC — The JTWC reports that Typhoon Neoguri has become equivalent to a Category 4 typhoon on the SSHWS.
15:00 UTC — PAGASA reports that Typhoon Neoguri, is about to enter the Philippine area of responsibility and names it Florita.

July 6
18:00 UTC — The JMA reports that Typhoon Neoguri (Florita) has reached its peak intensity, with 10-minute sustained wind speeds of 185 km/h (115 mph).
18:00 UTC — The JTWC reports that Typhoon Neoguri (Florita) has become a super typhoon.

July 7
00:00 UTC — The JTWC reports that Super Typhoon Neoguri (Florita) has reached its peak intensity with 1-minute sustained wind speeds of 250 km/h (155 mph).
18:00 UTC — The JTWC reports that Super Typhoon Neoguri (Florita) has weakened into a typhoon and become equivalent to a Category 3 typhoon on the SSHWS.

July 8
18:00 UTC — The JTWC reports that Typhoon Neoguri (Florita) has weakened and become equivalent to a Category 2 typhoon on the SSHWS.

July 9
06:00 UTC — The JMA reports that Typhoon Neoguri (Florita) has weakened into a severe tropical storm.
12:00 UTC — The JTWC reports that Typhoon Neoguri (Florita) has weakened into a tropical storm.

July 10
00:00 UTC — The JMA reports that Typhoon Neoguri (Florita) has made landfall over the island of Kyushu.
12:00 UTC — The JTWC issues its final advisory on Tropical Storm Neoguri (Florita) as it transitions into an extratropical cyclone and issues its final advisory.
12:00 UTC — The JTWC initiates advisories on the tropical depression that was previously located to the southeast of Hagåtña, Guam and assigns it the designation 09W.
18:00 UTC — The JMA reports that Severe Tropical Storm Neoguri (Florita) has weakened into a tropical storm.

July 11
00:00 UTC — The JMA reports that Tropical Storm Neoguri (Florita) has transitioned into an extratropical cyclone.
00:00 UTC — The JTWC reports that Tropical Depression 09W has intensified into a tropical storm.
06:00 UTC — The JMA reports that Tropical Depression 09W has intensified into a tropical storm and names it Rammasun.
12:00 UTC — The JTWC reports that Tropical Storm Rammasun has weakened into a tropical depression.

July 13
00:00 UTC — The JTWC reports that Tropical Depression Rammasun has re-intensified into a tropical storm.
00:00 UTC — PAGASA names Tropical Storm Rammasun: Glenda, as it enters the Philippine area of responsibility.
12:00 UTC — The JMA reports that the extratropical remnants of former Typhoon Neoguri (Florita), have dissipated within the Sea of Okhotsk.

July 14
00:00 UTC — The JMA reports that Tropical Storm Rammasun has intensified into a severe tropical storm.
12:00 UTC — The JTWC reports that Tropical Storm Rammasun has intensified and become equivalent to a Category 1 typhoon on the SSHWS.
18:00 UTC — The JMA reports that Severe Tropical Storm Rammasun has intensified into a typhoon.

July 15
06:00 UTC — The JTWC reports that Tropical Storm Rammasun has intensified and become equivalent to a Category 3 typhoon on the SSHWS.

July 16
06:00 UTC — The JMA reports that a tropical depression, has developed to the northeast of Palau.
12:00 UTC — The JMA reports that Typhoon Rammasun has weakened into a severe tropical storm.

July 17
00:00 UTC — The JMA reports that Severe Tropical Storm Rammasun has re-intensified into a typhoon.
06:00 UTC — Typhoon Rammasun intensifies back into a Category 4 typhoon.
12:00 UTC — The JMA reports that the tropical depression previously located to the northeast of Palau has become a tropical storm.
12:00 UTC — The JTWC initiates advisories on the tropical depression and assigns it the designation: 10W.
18:00 UTC — The JMA names the tropical storm: Matmo.
18:00 UTC — The JTWC reports that Tropical Depression Matmo has intensified into a tropical storm.
21:00 UTC — PAGASA reports that Tropical Storm Matmo has entered the Philippine area of responsibility and names it Henry.

July 18
06:00 UTC — Rammasun still slowly intensifies as the JTWC classifies it as a super typhoon.
06:00 UTC — The JMA reports that Typhoon Rammasun has peaked with 10-minute sustained wind speeds of 165 km/h (105 mph).
07:30 UTC — Typhoon Rammasun makes landfall at Wenchang on the island of Hainan, before emerging into the Qiongzhou Strait.
11:30 UTC — Typhoon Rammasun makes landfall at Xuwen County in the Chinese province of Guangdong, before emerging into the Gulf of Tonkin.
18:00 UTC — The JMA reports that Tropical Storm Matmo has intensified into a severe tropical storm.
23:10 UTC — Typhoon Rammasun makes landfall at Fangchenggang in the Chinese province of Guangxi.

July 19
00:00 UTC — The JMA reports that Typhoon Rammasun has weakened into a severe tropical storm over the Chinese Province of Guangxi.
00:00 UTC — The JTWC issues its final advisory on Typhoon Rammasun as it weakens and becomes equivalent to a Category 3 typhoon on the SSHWS over the Chinese Province of Guangxi.
06:00 UTC — The JMA reports that Severe Tropical Storm Rammasun has weakened into a tropical storm over the Chinese Province of Guangxi.
12:00 UTC — The JTWC reports that Tropical Storm Matmo has become equivalent to a Category 1 typhoon on the SSHWS.
12:00 UTC — The JMA starts monitoring another tropical depression located east of Guam.
18:00 UTC — The JTWC made its final warning on Rammasun.

July 20
06:00 UTC — The JMA reports that Tropical Depression Rammasun has dissipated over the Chinese Province of Yunnan.
18:00 UTC — The JMA reports that Severe Tropical Storm Matmo has intensified into a typhoon.

July 22
03:00 UTC — The tropical depression becomes better organized, as the JTWC issues a tropical cyclone formation alert on the depression.
15:00 UTC — The JTWC upgrades Matmo to a Category 2 typhoon on the SSHWS.
16:15 UTC — Typhoon Matmo makes landfall on Taitung, Taiwan, before emerging into the Taiwan Strait.
18:00 UTC — The JMA reports that Typhoon Matmo has weakened into a severe tropical storm.
21:00 UTC — The tropical depression weakens to a LPA.

July 23
06:00 UTC — Matmo slightly weakens to a Category 1 typhoon on the SSHWS.
Matmo makes landfall over eastern China.
12:00 UTC — The JMA reports that Severe Tropical Storm Matmo has weakened into a tropical storm, while located over the Chinese province of Fujian.
15:00 UTC — The JTWC issues its final advisory on Matmo, as it rapidly weakens to a moderate tropical storm and declares it extratropical.

July 25
06:00 UTC — The JMA reports that Tropical Storm Matmo has transitioned into an extratropical cyclone, while located over the Yellow Sea.
09:10 UTC — The extratropical remnants of Typhoon Matmo make landfall at Rongcheng in the Chinese province of Shandong.

July 26
06:00 UTC — The JMA reports that the extratropical remnants, of Typhoon Matmo have dissipated over North Korea.

July 27

July 28
09:00 UTC — The other tropical depression east of the Philippines starts to move in a northward direction and intensify.
15:00 UTC — The JTWC designates the depression near the Caroline Islands as 11W.

July 29
00:00 UTC — PAGASA initiates advisories on the tropical depression and names it Inday.
00:00 UTC — The JMA reports that Tropical Depression Inday has intensified into a tropical storm.
06:00 UTC — The JMA names Tropical Depression Jose: Halong.
12:00 UTC — The JMA reports that Tropical Depression Inday has intensified into a tropical storm.
21:00 UTC — The JMA names Tropical Storm Inday: Nakri.

July 31
18:00 UTC — The JMA reports that tropical storms Halong and Nakri (Inday) have intensified into severe tropical storms.

August
August 1
18:00 UTC — The JMA reports that Severe Tropical Storm Halong has intensified into a typhoon.

August 2
06:00 UTC — Halong intensifies into a Category 4 typhoon, just before entering the PAR.
06:00 UTC — The JTWC initiates advisories on Tropical Storm Nakri (Inday) and assigns it the designation 12W.
12:00 UTC — The JMA reports that Severe Tropical Storm Nakri (Inday) has weakened into a tropical storm.
18:00 UTC — Due to the explosive intensification of Halong, JTWC upgrades it to a Category 5 super typhoon.

August 3
06:00 UTC — The JTWC reports that Tropical Storm Nakri has weakened into a tropical depression.
21:00 UTC — The JTWC issues its final advisory on Tropical Depression Nakri (Inday), as the system approached South Korea's west coast.

August 4
00:00 UTC — Halong starts to undergo an eyewall replacement cycle, as it weakens to a mid-Category 4 typhoon.
06:00 UTC — The JMA reports that Tropical Depression Nakri has dissipated over South Korea.

August 6
03:00 UTC — Halong weakens to a minimal typhoon, due to the continuation of the eyewall replacement cycle.

August 7
06:00 UTC — The JMA reports that Hurricane Genevieve, has become a typhoon as it moves into the basin from the Central Pacific.
06:00 UTC — The JTWC reports that Typhoon Genevieve has entered the basin, while equivalent to a Category 4 super typhoon on the SSHWS.
12:00 UTC — The JTWC reports that Typhoon Genevieve has become equivalent, to a Category 5 super typhoon on the SSHWS.
18:00 UTC — The JMA reports that Typhoon Genevieve has reached its peak intensity, with 10-minute sustained windspeeds of 205 km/h (125 mph).

August 8
12:00 UTC — The JTWC reports that Genevieve has weakened and become equivalent to a Category 4 super typhoon on the SSHWS.
18:00 UTC — The JTWC reports that Genevieve has weakened and become equivalent to a Category 4 typhoon on the SSHWS.

August 10
06:00 UTC — The JMA reports that Typhoon Halong has weakened into a severe tropical storm.
18:00 UTC — The JMA reports that Typhoon Genevieve has weakened into a severe tropical storm.

August 11
00:00 UTC — The JMA reports that Severe Tropical Storm Halong has transitioned into an extratropical cyclone.
00:00 UTC — The JTWC issues their final warning on Halong, as it degenerates into an extratropical cyclone.
06:00 UTC — The JMA reports that Severe Tropical Storm Genevieve has weakened into a tropical storm.

August 12
06:00 UTC — The JMA reports that Tropical Storm Genevieve has weakened into a tropical depression.

August 14
12:00 UTC — The JMA reports that Tropical Depression Genevieve has dissipated.

August 15
06:00 UTC — The JMA reports that the extratropical remnants of Typhoon Halong have dissipated.

August 19
00:00 UTC — The JMA briefly monitors a tropical depression, that was located to the northeast of Hong Kong, China.

August 27
06:00 UTC — The JMA monitors another tropical depression in the South China Sea.
18:00 UTC — The system shows a bit of intensification, as it nearly makes landfall over Hainan Island.

August 29
03:00 UTC — Although, the depression is located over land and with this, it transitioned into an overland low-pressure.
18:00 UTC — A low-pressure area forms from an area of convection southeast of Palau.

August 31
00:00 UTC — It intensifies into a tropical disturbance and enters an area of favorable conditions of strengthening into a tropical storm in the next couple of days.

September

September 4

September 5
18:00 UTC — The JMA stops monitoring the tropical depression previously located to the southeast of Tokyo, Japan.

September 6
09:00 UTC — PAGASA names the tropical depression Karding.
18:00 UTC — The JMA reports that the tropical depression previously located to the southeast of Taipei, Taiwan, has intensified into a tropical storm.

September 7
00:00 UTC — The JMA names the tropical storm Fengshen.
00:00 UTC — The JTWC starts monitoring Fengshen as a tropical depression and assigns it the designation 13W.
06:00 UTC — The JTWC reports that Tropical Depression Fengshen has intensified into a tropical storm.
06:00 UTC — The JTWC initiates advisories on Tropical Depression Karding and assigns it the designation 14W.
18:00 UTC — The JMA reports that Tropical Storm Fengshen has intensified into a severe tropical storm.

September 8
00:00 UTC — The JTWC made their final warning on Tropical Depression 14W (Karding), as it makes landfall over Southern China.
06:00 UTC — The JMA estimates that Severe Tropical Storm Fengshen has reached its peak intensity, with 10-minute sustained wind speeds of 110 km/h (70 mph).
12:00 UTC — The JMA stops monitoring Tropical Depression Karding.

September 10
18:00 UTC — The JMA reports that Severe Tropical Storm Fengshen has transitioned into an extratropical cyclone.

September 11
06:00 UTC — The JMA reports that the extra tropical remnants of Severe Tropical Storm Fengshen have dissipated to the east of Japan.
18:00 UTC — The JMA starts monitoring Tropical Depression 15W as a tropical depression.

September 12
06:00 UTC — The JMA reports that Tropical Depression 15W has intensified into a tropical storm and names it Kalmaegi.
09:00 UTC — PAGASA names Tropical Storm Kalmaegi: Luis, as the system enters its area of responsibility.

September 13
00:00 UTC — The JMA reports that Tropical Storm Kalmaegi has intensified into a severe tropical storm.
15:00 UTC — The JTWC upgrades Kalmaegi to a Category 1 typhoon.
18:00 UTC — The JMA reports that Severe Tropical Storm Kalmaegi has intensified into a typhoon.

September 14
12:00 UTC — Typhoon Kalmaegi makes landfall over Cagayan.
12:00 UTC — Due to land interaction, the JTWC downgrades the system to a tropical storm.

September 16
00:00 UTC — The JMA estimates that Typhoon Kalmaegi has reached its peak intensity of 75 knots.
01:40 UTC — Typhoon Kalmaegi makes landfall at Wenchang on the island of Hainan, before emerging into the Qiongzhou Strait.
04:45 UTC — Typhoon Kalmaegi makes landfall at Xuwen County in the Chinese province of Guangdong, before emerging into the Gulf of Tonkin.
15:00 UTC — Typhoon Kalmaegi makes landfall over the Vietnamese province of Quảng Ninh.
18:00 UTC — The JMA reports that Typhoon Kalmaegi has weakened into a severe tropical storm, while the system is located over the Vietnamese province of Lạng Sơn.
18:00 UTC — The JTWC reports that Typhoon Kalmaegi has weakened into a tropical storm and issues its final advisory on the system.

September 17
00:00 UTC — The JMA reports that a tropical depression has developed to the south-east of Manila, Philippines.
06:00 UTC — The JMA reports that Severe Tropical Storm Kalmaegi has weakened into a tropical storm, while the system is located over the Chinese province of Yunnan.
09:00 UTC — PAGASA names the tropical depression: Mario.
12:00 UTC — The JTWC begins issuing warnings on the system and designates it as Tropical Depression 16W.
12:00 UTC — The JMA reports that the tropical depression has intensified into Tropical Storm Fung-wong.
12:00 UTC — The JMA reports that Tropical Storm Kalmaegi has weakened into a tropical depression over the Laotian province of Phongsaly.

September 18
00:00 UTC — The JMA reports that Tropical Depression Kalmaegi, has dissipated over the Burmese state of Shan.
18:00 UTC — The JMA estimates that Tropical Storm Fung-wong has reached its peak intensity, with 10-minute sustained windspeeds of 85 km/h (50 mph).

September 22

September 24
00:00 UTC — The JMA reports that Tropical Storm Fung-wong has transitioned into an extratropical cyclone.
12:00 UTC — The JTWC initiates advisories on the tropical depression and assigns it the designation 17W.
12:00 UTC — The JMA reports that Tropical Depression 17W has intensified into a tropical storm and names it Kammuri.

September 25
06:00 UTC — The JMA reports that the extratropical remnants of Tropical Storm Fung-wong have dissipated over Japan.
12:00 UTC — The JTWC reports that Tropical Depression Kammuri has intensified into a tropical storm.

September 26
12:00 UTC — The JMA reports that Tropical Storm Kammuri has intensified into a severe tropical storm, as the system reached its peak intensity with 10-minute sustained wind speeds of 95 km/h (60 mph).

September 27
12:00 UTC — The JMA reports that Severe Tropical Storm Kammuri has weakened into a tropical storm.

September 28
12:00 UTC — The area of convection intensifies into Tropical Depression 18W.

September 29
06:00 UTC — The JMA reports that Tropical Depression 18W has intensified into tropical storm and names it Phanfone.
12:00 UTC — The JTWC made their last advisory on Kammuri.

September 30
00:00 UTC — The JMA reports that Tropical Storm Kammuri, has transitioned into an extratropical cyclone.
12:00 UTC — The JMA reports that Tropical Storm Phanfone has intensified into a severe tropical storm.

October
October 1
03:00 UTC — The JTWC upgrades Phanfone to a typhoon.
06:00 UTC — The JMA reports that Severe Tropical Storm Phanfone has intensified into a typhoon.
18:00 UTC — The JMA stops monitoring the extratropical remnants of Severe Tropical Storm Kammuri, as they have moved across the International Dateline into the Eastern Pacific Ocean.

October 2
03:00 UTC — Phanfone intensifies into a Category 3 typhoon.
06:00 UTC — The JMA reports that Typhoon Phanfone has reached its peak intensity, with 10-minute sustained windspeeds of 175 km/h (110 mph).
09:00 UTC — The JTWC upgrades Phanfone to Category 4 typhoon.
15:00 UTC — Phanfone weakens into a Category 3 typhoon.
21:00 UTC — The JTWC designates the tropical depression as Tropical Depression 19W.

October 3
00:00 UTC — PAGASA starts issuing warnings on Phanfone and named it Neneng.
12:00 UTC — The JMA names Tropical Depression 19W; Vongfong.
18:00 UTC — The JMA reports that Tropical Depression Vongfong has intensified into a tropical storm.
21:00 UTC — The JTWC upgrades Phanfone to a Category 4 typhoon again.

October 4
03:00 UTC — Phanfone intensifies into a Category 4 super typhoon.
09:00 UTC — Vongfong was upgraded to a Category 1 typhoon by the JTWC.
12:00 UTC — The JMA reports that Tropical Storm Vongfong has intensified into a severe tropical storm.
15:00 UTC — Phanfone was downgraded to a Category 3 typhoon by the JTWC.

October 5
09:00 UTC — Phanfone weakens to a Category 2 typhoon.
In the same time, the JTWC upgrades Vongfong to a Category 2 typhoon.

October 6
06:00 UTC — The JMA reports that Typhoon Phanfone has weakened into a severe tropical storm.
09:00 UTC — The JTWC issues their final advisory on Phanfone, as it transitions into an extratropical cyclone.
12:00 UTC — The JMA reports that Typhoon Phanfone has transitioned into an extratropical cyclone.

October 7
03:00 UTC — The JTWC reports that Typhoon Vongfong has intensified and become equivalent to a Category 3 typhoon on the SSHWS.
06:00 UTC — PAGASA names Vongfong: Ompong, as it enters their area of responsibility.
06:00 UTC — The JTWC reports that Typhoon Vongfong has intensified and become equivalent to a Category 4 typhoon on the SSHWS.
12:00 UTC — The JTWC reports that Typhoon Vongfong has intensified and become equivalent to a Category 4 super typhoon on the SSHWS.
18:00 UTC — The JMA reports that Typhoon Vongfong has reached its peak intensity with 10-minute sustained wind speeds of 215 km/h (130 mph).
18:00 UTC — The JTWC reports that Typhoon Vongfong has intensified and become equivalent to a Category 5 super typhoon on the SSHWS.

October 8
00:00 UTC — The JMA stops monitoring the extratropical remnants of Typhoon Phanfone, as they have moved across the International Dateline into the Eastern Pacific Ocean.

October 9
06:00 UTC — The JTWC reports that Typhoon Vongfong has weakened and become equivalent to a Category 4 super typhoon on the SSHWS.

October 10
06:00 UTC — The JTWC reports that Typhoon Vongfong has weakened and become equivalent to a Category 4 typhoon on the SSHWS.
18:00 UTC —  The JTWC reports that Typhoon Vongfong has weakened and become equivalent to a Category 3 typhoon on the SSHWS.

October 11
06:00 UTC — The JTWC reports that Typhoon Vongfong has weakened and become equivalent to a Category 2 typhoon on the SSHWS.
12:00 UTC — The JTWC reports that Typhoon Vongfong has weakened and become equivalent to a Category 1 typhoon on the SSHWS.

October 12
03:00 UTC — The JTWC reports that Typhoon Vongfong has weakened into a tropical storm.

October 13
00:00 UTC — The JMA reports that Typhoon Vongfong has weakened into a severe tropical storm, while located over the Japanese island of Kyushu.
06:00 UTC — The JMA reports that Severe Tropical Storm Vongfong has made landfall on the Japanese island of Shikoku.
12:00 UTC — The JMA reports that Severe Tropical Storm Vongfong has made landfall on the Japanese island of Honshu.

October 14
00:00 UTC — The JMA reports that Severe Tropical Storm Vongfong has transitioned into an extratropical cyclone as it emerges into the Pacific Ocean.

October 16
12:00 UTC — The JMA stops monitoring the extratropical remnants of Typhoon Vongfong, as they have moved across the International Dateline into the Eastern Pacific Ocean.

October 30

October 31
00:00 UTC — The JTWC initiates advisories on the tropical depression and assigns it the designation 20W.
00:00 UTC — The JMA reports that Tropical Depression 20W has intensified into a tropical storm.
06:00 UTC — The JMA names Tropical Depression 20W: Nuri.
12:00 UTC — The JTWC reports that Tropical Depression Nuri has intensified into a tropical storm.
12:00 UTC — PAGASA names Tropical Storm Nuri: Paeng, as the system enters the Philippine area of responsibility.

November
November 1
00:00 UTC — The JMA reports that Tropical Storm Nuri has intensified into a severe tropical storm.
12:00 UTC — The JMA reports that Severe Tropical Storm Nuri has intensified into a typhoon.
18:00 UTC — The JTWC reports that Tropical Storm Nuri has intensified and become equivalent to a Category 1 typhoon on the SSHWS.

November 2
00:00 UTC — The JTWC reports that Typhoon Nuri has intensified and become equivalent to a Category 2 typhoon on the SSHWS.
06:00 UTC — The JTWC reports that Typhoon Nuri has intensified and become equivalent to a Category 4 typhoon on the SSHWS.
12:00 UTC — The JMA reports that Typhoon Nuri has reached its peak intensity with 10-minute sustained wind speeds of 285 km/h (180 mph).
12:00 UTC — The JTWC reports that Typhoon Nuri has intensified and become a super typhoon.
18:00 UTC — The JTWC reports that Super Typhoon Nuri has intensified and become equivalent to a Category 5 typhoon on the SSHWS. At the same time they report that the system has reached its peak intensity with 1-minute sustained wind speeds of 285 km/h (180 mph).

November 4
00:00 UTC — The JTWC reports that Super Typhoon Nuri has weakened and become equivalent to a Category 4 typhoon on the SSHWS.
06:00 UTC — The JTWC reports that Super Typhoon Nuri has weakened into a typhoon.
18:00 UTC — The JTWC reports that Typhoon Nuri has weakened and become equivalent to a Category 3 typhoon on the SSHWS.

November 5
06:00 UTC — The JTWC reports that Typhoon Nuri has weakened and become equivalent to a Category 2 typhoon on the SSHWS.
12:00 UTC — The JTWC reports that Typhoon Nuri has weakened and become equivalent to a Category 1 typhoon on the SSHWS.
18:00 UTC — The JMA reports that Typhoon Nuri has weakened into a severe tropical storm.

November 6
00:00 UTC — The JTWC issues its final advisory on Typhoon Nuri as it has weakened into a tropical storm and transitioned into an extratropical cyclone.
18:00 UTC — The JMA reports that Severe Tropical Storm Nuri has transitioned into an extratropical cyclone.

November 7
12:00 UTC — The JMA reports that the extratropical remnants of Typhoon Nuri have dissipated.

November 25

November 26
00:00 UTC — The JMA starts to monitor Tropical Depression Queenie.
06:00 UTC — The JTWC initiates advisories on Tropical Depression Queenie and assigns it the designation 21W.
10:00 UTC — Tropical Depression 21W (Queenie) makes landfall on the Philippine island of Mindanao, in the vicinity of Tandag, Surigao del Sur.

November 28
00:00 UTC — The JMA reports that Tropical Depression Queenie has intensified into a tropical storm and names it Sinlaku as it moves through the Spratly Islands.
03:00 UTC — The JTWC upgrades Sinlaku to a tropical storm.
12:00 UTC — PAGASA releases its final advisory on Sinlaku (Queenie) as it exits their area of responsibility.

November 30
03:00 UTC — The JTWC stops issuing advisories on Sinlaku.
06:00 UTC — The JMA reports that Tropical Storm Sinlaku (Queenie) has weakened into a tropical depression.
12:00 UTC — The JMA reports that Tropical Depression Sinlaku (Queenie) has dissipated over Vietnam.

December
December 1
00:00 UTC — The JMA reports that the tropical depression has developed into a tropical storm, while the JTWC classifies the system as Tropical Depression 22W.
06:00 UTC — The JTWC reports that Tropical Depression 22W has intensified into a tropical storm while the JMA named it: Hagupit.

December 2
18:00 UTC — Hagupit intensifies into a minimal typhoon.

December 3
18:00 UTC — Typhoon Hagupit enters the PAR and PAGASA names the storm: Ruby.
21:00 UTC — Hagupit intensifies into a Category 5 super typhoon.

December 27

December 28
00:00 UTC — The JMA and JTWC start to monitor Tropical Depression Seniang.
12:00 UTC — The JMA reports that Tropical Depression Seniang has intensified into a tropical storm.
21:00 UTC — The JTWC upgrades Seniang to a tropical storm.

December 29
00:00 UTC — According to the JMA, Seniang intensifies into Tropical Storm Jangmi.
18:00 UTC — The JMA reports that Tropical Storm Jangmi (Seniang) has reached its peak intensity, with 10-minute sustained windspeeds of 40 kts.

December 30
12:00 UTC — The JMA reports that Tropical Storm Jangmi (Seniang) has weakened into a tropical depression.

January 1, 2015
12:00 UTC — Tropical Depression Jangmi (Seniang) makes landfall in the Malaysian state of Sabah on the island of Borneo.
18:00 UTC — The JMA reports that Tropical Depression Jangmi (Seniang) has dissipated over the Malaysian state of Sabah on the island of Borneo.

See also

Timeline of the 2014 Pacific hurricane season
Timeline of the 2014 Atlantic hurricane season

Footnotes

References

External links

τ
Pacific typhoon season meteorological timelines
2014 WPac T